Robert Henry Fraser (10 December 1869–30 May 1947) was a New Zealand stained glass artist. He was born in Dunedin, New Zealand on 10 December 1869.

References

1869 births
1947 deaths
Artists from Dunedin
New Zealand glass artists